Parhedyle is a genus of gastropods belonging to the family Microhedylidae.

The species of this genus are found in Europe.

Species:

Parhedyle cryptophthalma 
Parhedyle odhneri 
Parhedyle tyrtowii

References

Microhedylidae